"Promises" is a song co-written and recorded by American country music singer Randy Travis. It was originally released in March 1987, as the B-side of "Forever and Ever, Amen." Then it was released as the A-side in May 1989 as the fourth and final single from his album, Old 8x10, peaking at number 17 in the United States and number 12 Canada. The song was written by Travis and John Lindley.

Chart performance

References

1989 singles
Randy Travis songs
Songs written by Randy Travis
Song recordings produced by Kyle Lehning
Warner Records singles
1988 songs